The Permanent Conference of Political Parties of Latin America and the Caribbean (COPPPAL) is an international organization of political parties in Latin America and the Caribbean. It was created at the behest of the Institutional Revolutionary Party on 12 October 1979 in Oaxaca, Mexico, and brings together liberal, social democratic, Christian democratic, and other leftist political parties.
Its first president (1979–1981) was Gustavo Carvajal Moreno of Mexico (PRI). Its current president is the Mexican politician Alejandro Moreno Cárdenas (PRI).

COPPPAL was established during a 12 October 1979 conference in Oaxaca, Mexico, on the initiative of the Partido Revolucionario Institucional (PRI), the ruling party in Mexico at the time. The multilateral non-governmental organization was defined by its charter as a "forum of nationalist parties that prioritize sovereignty, while advancing a more just and egalitarian international order." 

The organization would advance this goal by 
"defending democracy and the legal and political institutions while fostering their development and improvement; strengthening the principle of self-determination of the peoples of Latin America; promoting regional integration; supporting any initiative for disarmament; promoting the defense, sovereignty and better utilization of the natural resources of each country in the region; boosting development; promoting Latin American regional organizations and joint actions that will enable the establishment of a more just international economic order; defending and promoting respect for human rights." 

The organization was led by the PRI between its establishment in 1979 and 1984, and again between 1989 and 2005. Antonio Cafiero of the Justicialist Party (Argentina) was elected president of the coordinating committee in 2005, and Gustavo Carvajal Moreno of the PRI (Mexico) was elected as its adjunct president. Cafiero was succeeded in 2011 by Pedro Joaquín Coldwell of the PRI. The committee coordinates youth exchange, consultative, and other activities among its member parties, as well as with the International Conference of Asian Political Parties (ICAPP).

Membership
The following political parties from the Americas are represented at COPPPAL (associate members in italics):

See also
 International Conference of Asian Political Parties

References

External links
Official website

International organizations based in the Americas
Left-wing internationals
Organizations established in 1979
Politics of South America
Politics of the Caribbean
Latin America and the Caribbean